Yemane Ghebremichael (born January 21, 1949 – November 5, 1997) (commonly known as Yemane Baria or Yemane Barya) was a well-known Eritrean songwriter, composer and singer. He became one of the most renowned Eritrean artists (a Tigrinya singer).

Biography
Yemane's songwriting strove to reflect what he perceived to be Eritrean experience during the Eritrean War of Independence. His songs were dotted with stories of love, journey, hope, migration, and liberation. In 1975, he was jailed for the perceived political interpretation of one of his songs.

A few years after the declaration of the independence of Eritrea, Yemane moved to Asmara and continued to release albums that reflected the new era of hope and national prosperity, with a mixture of Eritrean melodies. He also sang about the people involved in the movement towards Eritrean independence and the sacrifices of that movement. Yemane's songs are distinct in the way that they feature a pattern with a recurring melancholic piece of melody.

Yemane was also known as the 'Eritrean caretaker'.
He died on November 5,1997 due to a long illness.

Popular songs and albums
 (ሓዳር ጊርኪ)
 Wedebat Adey (ወደባት ዓደይ)
 Asmera, (ኣስመራ)
 Zemen, (ዘመን)
 Meskerem, (መስከረም)
 Natsenet, (ናጽነት）
 Delay Selam, （ደላይ ሰላም）
 Aykonen Oromay, （ኣይኮነን ኦሮማይ）
 Wegihaya Meriet, （ወጊሓያ መሬት）
 Mesob-Ade. （መሶብ ኣደ）
 Ab Kulu Gobotat （ኣብ ኩሉ ጎቦታት）
 Nay Mekabir Bitsotey （ናይ መቃብር ብጾተይ）
 Tezkoneley, （ተዝኾነለይ）  
 Anbibeyo Debdabeki, （ኣንቢበዮ ደብዳቤኺ）
 Ab Sidet Zeleka, （ኣብ ስደት ዘለኻ）
 Kemeleki Zefkireki, （ከሜለኺ ዘፍቅረኪ）
 Yikielo Eye Ane, （ይኽእሎ ኢየ ኣነ）
 Gual Hagerey, （ጓል ሃገረይ）
 Bisirah Tegedide, （ብስራሕ ተገዲደ）
 Chira Feres, （ጭራ ፈረስ）
 Mealtat Newihuni, （መዓልታት ነዊሑኒ）
 Emo Ke Dea Hiji Entay Ygeber, (አሞ ኽ ደኣ ሕጂ አንታይ ይገበር)

References

1949 births
1997 deaths
20th-century Eritrean male singers
Eritrean male singer-songwriters
People from Southern Region (Eritrea)